Slig may refer to any of the following fictional creatures:

 Slig (Dune), a slug-pig hybrid in Frank Herbert's Dune universe
 Slig (Dungeons & Dragons), a creature in the Dragonlance universe of novels and related media
 Sligs (Marvel Comics), an alien race encountered by Marvel Comics' Fantastic Four superhero team
 A creature in the Oddworld video game universe
 A member of Deep Six, a group of DC Comics villains